In mathematics and computer science, a history monoid is a way of representing the histories of concurrently running computer processes as a collection of strings, each string representing the individual history of a process. The history monoid provides a set of synchronization primitives (such as locks, mutexes or thread joins) for providing rendezvous points between a set of independently executing processes or threads.

History monoids occur in the theory of concurrent computation, and provide a low-level mathematical foundation for process calculi, such as CSP the language of communicating sequential processes, or CCS, the calculus of communicating systems. History monoids were first presented by M.W. Shields.

History monoids are isomorphic to trace monoids (free partially commutative monoids) and to the monoid of dependency graphs. As such, they are free objects and are universal. The history monoid is a type of semi-abelian categorical product in the category of monoids.

Product monoids and projection
Let 

denote an n-tuple of (not necessarily pairwise disjoint) alphabets . Let  denote all possible combinations of one finite-length string from each alphabet:

The superscript star is the Kleene star.) Composition in the product monoid is component-wise, so that, for

and

then

Define the union alphabet to be

(The union here is the set union, not the disjoint union.) Given any string , we can pick out just the letters in some  using the corresponding string projection .

Histories
For every , the tuple  is called the elementary history of a. It serves as an indicator function for the inclusion of a letter a in an alphabet . That is,

where

Here,  denotes the empty string. The history monoid  is the submonoid of the product monoid  generated by the elementary histories:  (where the superscript star is the Kleene star applied with a component-wise definition of composition as given above).

Connection to computer science
The use of the word history in this context, and the connection to concurrent computing, can be understood as follows. An individual history is a record of the sequence of states of a process (or thread or machine); the alphabet  is the set of states of the process.

A letter that occurs in two or more alphabets serves as a synchronization primitive between the various individual histories. That is, if such a letter occurs in one individual history, it must also occur in another history, and serves to "tie" or "rendezvous" them together.

The union alphabet is of course . In this example, an individual history of the first process might be  while the individual history of the second machine might be . Both of these individual histories are represented by the global history , since the projection of this string onto the individual alphabets yields the individual histories. Such commutation is simply a statement that the first and second processes are running concurrently, and are unordered with respect to each other; they have not (yet) exchanged any messages or performed any synchronization.

The letter  serves as a synchronization primitive, as its occurrence marks a spot in both the global and individual histories, that cannot be commuted across.

Properties
A history monoid is isomorphic to a trace monoid, and as such, is a type of semi-abelian categorical product in the category of monoids.  In particular, the history monoid  is isomorphic to the trace monoid  with the dependency relation given by

In simple terms, this is just the formal statement of the informal discussion given above: the letters in an alphabet  can be commutatively re-ordered past the letters in an alphabet , unless they are letters that occur in both alphabets. Thus, traces are exactly global histories, and vice versa.

Notes

References
 Antoni Mazurkiewicz, "Introduction to Trace Theory", pp 3–41, in The Book of Traces, V. Diekert, G. Rozenberg, eds. (1995) World Scientific, Singapore 
 Volker Diekert, Yves Métivier, "Partial Commutation and Traces", In G. Rozenberg and A. Salomaa, editors, Handbook of Formal Languages, Vol. 3, Beyond Words, pages 457–534. Springer-Verlag, Berlin, 1997.

Concurrency (computer science)
Semigroup theory
Formal languages
Free algebraic structures